The World Is Ours is the debut studio album by American metalcore band Upon a Burning Body. The album was released on April 6, 2010, through Sumerian Records and was produced by William Putney. All of the song titles are taken from films, in most of which Al Pacino starred.

Track listing

Credits
Upon a Burning Body
 Danny Leal  – vocals
 Sal Dominguez  – lead guitar
 Chris "C.J." Johnson  – rhythm guitar
 Ruben Alvarez  – bass
 Ramon "Lord Cocos" Villareal  – drums
Production
 Will Putney  – mixing, mastering
 616 Visual and McBride Design  – artwork
 Mike Belenda  logo – UABB
Guest musicians
  Carmen Serignese (Up In Arms) vocals – on "City Hall"

Chart performance

References

2010 debut albums
Upon a Burning Body albums
Sumerian Records albums
Albums produced by Will Putney